Berești-Meria is a commune in Galați County, Western Moldavia, Romania with a population of 3,500 people. It is composed of ten villages: Aldești, Balintești, Berești-Meria, Onciu, Pleșa, Prodănești, Puricani, Săseni, Slivna and Șipote.

Natives
 Valeria Cătescu
 Ion Popescu

References

Communes in Galați County
Localities in Western Moldavia